Hammatoderus brunneus is a species of beetle in the family Cerambycidae. It was described by Dillon and Dillon in 1941. It is known from Mexico.

References

Hammatoderus
Beetles described in 1941